Robin Geffen is a British financier and classic-winning racehorse owner.

Early life
Geffen was born in London in October 1957. He attended Oxford University, graduating in 1979 from Keble College in Politics, Philosophy and Economics.

Career
Following graduation, Geffen worked for Charterhouse J Rothschild, before moving to Eagle Star to work across European and Asia Pacific funds.  He worked for York Plc, Scottish Equitable and CIO before founding his own business, Neptune Investment Management in 2002.

Geffen was CEO for Neptune, but also continued to work across fund management. Despite strong early performances, concerns were raised about staff turnover, fund performance sand family promotions within the organisation. In August 2019, profits declined by 90%, Geffen stepped down as CEO as Neptune Investment Management was acquired by Liontrust for £40million.  Geffen remained with Liontrust in a Head of Global Equity role, although the Neptune brand was ultimately dropped.

Horse racing

Geffen's involvement in racing came in the 1990s with ownership through syndicates. In 2010, he became an owner of King Of Wands alongside Rachel Hood, the ROA President. Trained by John Gosden, he won the Esher Cup at Sandown. Geffen and Hood then purchase Arctic Cosmos, and won the St Leger at Doncaster. Geffen also owned Western Hymn a two time Grade 3 winner, and 6th in the 2014 Epsom Derby.  Geffen owned GM Hopkins who won the 2015 Royal Hunt Cup at Royal Ascot.

Alongside his flat horses, he also owned National Hunt horses trained by the likes of Paul Nicholls, David Pipe and Nicky Henderson. Geffen owned the likes of Wonderful Charm a two time Grade 2 winner including the Persian War at Chepstow.

In addition to being an owner, Geffen utilised his Neptune Investment Management business as a sponsor. He partnered Cheltenham Racecourse from 2009, and sponsored a broader series of races as "Neptune Investment Management Novices' Hurdles" across Cheltenham, Sandown and Warwick.

Personal life
Geffen is married to Camilla and they have two sons. In 2013, he appeared on the Sunday Times Rich List with a net worth of £90million.

References

Living people
People_from_London
1957 births
Alumni_of_Keble_College,_Oxford
British_businesspeople
British_company_founders
British_financial_company_founders
British_financial_businesspeople
British_money_managers
British racehorse owners and breeders